The Deacon Willard Lewis House is a historic house at 33 West Street in Walpole, Massachusetts.  The -story wood-frame house was built c. 1826 by Horatio Wood.  In 1863 it was purchased by Willard Lewis, owner of the Kendall Company.  The house has a roughly five-bay facade, although instead of paired windows on either side of the center entry, it has bay windows on the first floor.  The house is now owned by the Walpole Historical Society.

The house was listed on the National Register of Historic Places in 1975.

See also
National Register of Historic Places listings in Norfolk County, Massachusetts

References

External links
 Walpole Historical Society

Houses in Norfolk County, Massachusetts
Walpole, Massachusetts
Houses on the National Register of Historic Places in Norfolk County, Massachusetts